Arts and Letters (April 1, 1966 – October 16, 1998) was an American Hall of Fame Champion Thoroughbred racehorse.

Background
Arts and Letters was a chestnut horse owned and bred by American sportsman and philanthropist Paul Mellon, and trained by future Hall of Famer Elliott Burch.

Racing career
Arts and Letters began racing at age two.  He won two of his six starts in 1968, then at age three won two important Kentucky Derby prep races before finishing second in both the Derby and the Preakness Stakes to the undefeated California colt Majestic Prince.

He carried the well-known colors of dark grey, yellow braids, sleeves, and cap. Arts and Letters came back to win the 1½ mile Belmont Stakes under jockey Braulio Baeza, after which second-place finisher Majestic Prince was retired due to injury.  Arts and Letters went on to win several more important races in 1969.

At age four, Arts and Letters won one of three races. His career ended after he suffered an injury in the Californian Stakes.

Stud record
Standing at stud at Greentree Farm, he met with reasonable success.  The most notable of his stakes winning offspring was Codex, who gave trainer D. Wayne Lukas his first win in the U.S. Triple Crown race by capturing the 1980 Preakness Stakes. Arts and Letters also sired other grade one winners like the gelding Winters Tale, who won the Marlboro Cup H. (G1), Brooklyn H. (G1) and  Suburban H. (G1) and the gelding Lord Darnley who won Gulfstream Park H. (G1) and Widener H. (G1) along with many other stakes winners. Arts and Letters was euthanized at the advanced age of 32 in 1998 due to the infirmities of old age (though this date is listed as 2000 with the Jockey Club). He was buried at Greentree Farm, which is now part of Gainesway Farm.

Honors
Arts and Letters was voted three major awards in 1969, including the most prestigious: American Horse of the Year.

In 1994, Arts and Letters was inducted in the United States' National Museum of Racing and Hall of Fame.

References

 Arts and Letters' pedigree and racing stats
 Arts and Letters at the United States' National Museum of Racing and Hall of Fame

1966 racehorse births
1998 racehorse deaths
Racehorses bred in Virginia
Racehorses trained in the United States
Belmont Stakes winners
Eclipse Award winners
American Thoroughbred Horse of the Year
United States Thoroughbred Racing Hall of Fame inductees
Thoroughbred family 1-c